The song was originally written by Michael Allison and Peter Sills for British singer Cliff Richard, whom Olivia Newton-John was a backing singer for in the early 1970s. Richard originally attempted a recording of the song in December 1975 studio sessions for his 1976 studio album I'm Nearly Famous, but it remained unreleased. He recorded the song again for his 1977 studio album Every Face Tells a Story, for which it became the title track.

Richard's version uses the same music, but the lyrics are about Jesus and are Gospel-themed. Although a pop star, Richard is a Christian and sometimes includes Gospel tracks on his albums. Don Black rewrote the lyrics but kept the title, removing the Gospel theme.

Olivia Newton-John version

In 1976, Australian pop and country singer Olivia Newton-John recorded a version for her eighth studio album, Don't Stop Believin'. It was released as a single in November 1976 and peaked at #55 on the Billboard Hot 100 chart; #21 on the Hot Country Songs chart; and #6 on the Hot Adult Contemporary Tracks chart. She produced an MTV style promotional clip for the song, which aired on ABC in November 1976. The song was not released in Australia.

Charts

Other versions
 Swedish pop and country singer Kikki Danielsson covered the song (non-religious version) on her 1982 album Kikki.
 French Author and original performer of "My way", Claude François covered the Olivia Newton-John version in 1977 (Chaque visage dit une histoire).

References

1976 singles
Kikki Danielsson songs
Olivia Newton-John songs
Cliff Richard songs
Songs with lyrics by Don Black (lyricist)
MCA Records singles